David D. King is the current Administrative Judge of the New Hampshire Circuit Court.

Early life and education 
King is a 1981 graduate of Plymouth State College and received his J.D. from the Franklin Pierce Law Center (now UNH School of Law) in 1984.

Legal career 
King was a member of the New Hampshire House of Representatives and in 1984 was a delegate to the state's 17th Constitutional Convention. In 1985, he was hired by attorney Philip Waystack, and later became a partner in the firm of Waystack & King in Colebrook, New Hampshire. In 1990, he was appointed as the presiding judge in the Coos County Probate Court. In 2007, he left Waystack & King to become a full-time judge. He then served as the deputy administrative judge of the New Hampshire Circuit Court since it began operations in July 2011. After the departure of former administrative judge Edwin W. Kelly, he became the administrative judge of the New Hampshire Circuit Court.

Awards and community service 
In 2021, King received the Innovator of the Year Award from the National Council of Juvenile and Family Court Judges (NCJFCJ).

References

Living people
American judges
New Hampshire state court judges
21st-century American lawyers
University of New Hampshire School of Law alumni
1959 births